St. Macdara’s Island (officially St. Mac Dara’s Island) is a small island on which stands a medieval Christian monastery and National Monument. It is located off the coast of County Galway, Ireland. It is often traditionally called St. Macdara’s Island.

Location

History
Saint Sinach Macdara, patron saint of seafarers, is believed to have built a wooden church on the island in the sixth century. It was replaced by the present stone building in the 10th century. The roof stones were cut to mimic wood shingles.

Local fishermen traditionally dipped their sails three times while passing the island.

A wooden statue of the saint was paid special reverence by locals; in an act of iconoclasm the Archbishop of Tuam ordered it buried.

Every 16 July, local people make a pilgrimage to the island for a mass and blessing of boats (including the famous Galway hookers). Devotions were also formerly held on 28 September.

On Saturday, July 16, hundreds of pilgrims will cram onto a flotilla of currachs, pleasure craft and fishing boats at the several inlets and piers of Mace Head in Connemara to cross about 2km of sea to honour the memory of a sixth-century saint. Not a lot is known about St Macdara but his legacy has lasted more than 1,500 years from when he chose this barren island to establish his church.

There is no pier on the island. Nine people drowned on a pilgrimage to the island in a storm in 1907. The roof on the island’s church was restored in 1977. In addition to the church, there are three penitential stations consisting of cross slabs, and a holy well. There are also the ruins of a much later bothy around which animals were once raised. Nine people drowned on the pilgrimage in a storm in 1907. The island’s church featured on the 29 pence stamp in the 1980s.

Description
A stone church or oratory, probably a shrine for Macdara's remains. There are several cross slabs and an enclosure.

References

Christian monasteries in the Republic of Ireland
Religion in County Galway
Archaeological sites in County Galway
National Monuments in County Galway